Brendan Ward (born 14 January 1957) is a New Zealand cricketer. He played in four first-class and five List A matches for Northern Districts from 1986 to 1988.

See also
 List of Northern Districts representative cricketers

References

External links
 

1957 births
Living people
New Zealand cricketers
Northern Districts cricketers
Cricketers from Invercargill